Allan Andreas Luttecke Rascovky (born 31 January 1993) is a Chilean former professional footballer who played as a striker.

Career
Allan did all lower in Universidad Católica and his debut was in 2011 in a victory 2–0 against Cobreloa.
In July 2014 he's loan to Coquimbo Unido for a one-year loan.

Personal life
Luttecke is of German descent and holds the nationality. Also, he speaks German.

After his retirement, Luttecke focused on his studies and graduated as a pilot.

References

External links

1993 births
Living people
Chilean people of German descent
Footballers from Santiago
Chilean footballers
Club Deportivo Universidad Católica footballers
Coquimbo Unido footballers
Unión La Calera footballers
A.C. Barnechea footballers
Chilean Primera División players
Primera B de Chile players
Segunda División Profesional de Chile players
Association football forwards